The Fool is a 1913 British silent drama film directed by George Pearson and starring Godfrey Tearle, Mary Malone and James Carew. It was based on a poem by Rudyard Kipling.

Cast
 Godfrey Tearle as Sterndale 
 Mary Malone as Mrs. Brockwood  
 James Carew as Arthur Warde  
 Rex Davis

References

Bibliography
 Goble, Alan. The Complete Index to Literary Sources in Film. Walter de Gruyter, 1999.

External links
 

1913 films
1913 romantic drama films
British romantic drama films
British silent feature films
1910s English-language films
Films based on works by Rudyard Kipling
Films directed by George Pearson
Films set in England
British black-and-white films
1910s British films
Silent romantic drama films